The PCGamingWiki is a British-based collaboratively edited free wiki internet encyclopaedia focused on collecting video game behaviour data (such as save locations and startup parameters), to optimising gameplay, and fixing issues found in PC games. Intended fixes and optimisations range from simple cut-scene removals, to modifications that allow for wide-screen resolutions, and more. The wiki site runs on MediaWiki software, and was created by Andrew Tsai, a British businessman from London, England. As of October 2022, the PCGamingWiki has more than 30,000 registered users, and 48,000 content pages. Since its inception, the PCGamingWiki has been featured on numerous gaming focused websites, including Kotaku, Destructoid, and Rock Paper Shotgun. It regularly receives more than 10,000 unique page views a day.

Andrew was motivated to create the site due to his experiences seeing countless people on forums asking for help with the computer games LA Noire and Titan Quest.

History
Andrew has said he was motivated to create the wiki based on his experiences with the games LA Noire and Titan Quest. The wiki was mostly baren until Andrew enlisted the help of users on the website reddit.

On 11 April 2012, Andrew attempted to Kickstart the PCGamingWiki with a goal of $60,000.  The project ended on 12 May 2012, failing to complete its goal and only earning $2,736.  On 19 December 2012 the project was started, this time with a goal of £500.  This was much more successful, ending on 20 January 2013 with more than 400% funding.

On 24 December 2012, the PCGamingWiki forums were created with help from user JRWR.  The forums are used to discuss articles, improvements, fix problems, and report bugs.  As of March 2014, there have been 3374 posts to the forums.

On 26 March 2013, Andrew Tsai announced a new section of the PCGamingWiki network entitled The Port Report.  The Port Report would function in a similar way to the, then recently defunct, Port Authority section of GameSpy.  The Port Report would focus on video games ported from video game console to PC, and judge them based on their technical prowess, rather than story or gameplay.  Based on similar concepts from the wiki, The Port Report allows anyone to submit articles for publishing.

On 29 November 2014, a Patreon funding campaign with the goal of supporting the website was launched.

In April 2020, the wiki launched new categories to track a game's monetisation model, including the types of microtransactions present.

References

External links

PCGamingWiki.com

MediaWiki websites
Wiki communities
Online encyclopedias
Internet properties established in 2012
Video game websites
British websites